The 6th (Brandenburg) Cuirassiers “Emperor Nicholas I of Russia” were a heavy cavalry regiment of the Royal Prussian Army. The regiment was formed in 1807. The regiment fought in the War of the Sixth Coalition, the Second Schleswig War, the Austro-Prussian War, the Franco-Prussian War and  World War I. The regiment was disbanded in 1919.

See also
List of Imperial German cavalry regiments

References

Cuirassiers of the Prussian Army
Military units and formations established in 1807
Military units and formations disestablished in 1919